The 1934–35 Connecticut State Huskies men's basketball team represented Connecticut State College, now the University of Connecticut, in the 1934–35 collegiate men's basketball season. This was the first year that the team was named the Huskies. The Huskies completed the season with a 7–8 overall record. The Huskies were members of the New England Conference, where they ended the season with a 1–2 record. The Huskies played their home games at Hawley Armory in Storrs, Connecticut, and were led by fourth-year head coach John J. Heldman, Jr.

Schedule 

|-
!colspan=12 style=""| Regular Season

Schedule Source:

References 

UConn Huskies men's basketball seasons
Connecticut
1934 in sports in Connecticut
1935 in sports in Connecticut